Elizabeth De Razzo is an American actress. She is best known for her recurring role as Maria in the sports comedy television series Eastbound & Down.

Career 
Her first on-screen appearance was a role as Shirley in the episode "The Promise" of CBS's police procedural television series Cold Case. She also had roles in television series ER, United States of Tara and Southland. In 2010, she was cast as Maria for the second season of sports comedy television series Eastbound & Down. In the third season of Eastbound & Down, she was credited with the main cast. De Razzo's film credits include The 33 (2015), The Greasy Strangler (2016) and Lemon (2017).

Filmography

References

External links

 Elizabeth De Razzo on Twitter

Living people
American film actresses
21st-century American actresses
Year of birth missing (living people)